Core Creek is a populated place in Carteret County, North Carolina, United States.

References

Unincorporated communities in Carteret County, North Carolina